Scars Upon My Heart is a 1981 poetry anthology collected by Catherine Reilly that focuses on poetry written by women during the First World War, often from wives and girlfriends who had loved ones serving in Europe, as well as including poems from those who had lost loved ones. Many of the poets were little-known before their publication in Scars Upon My Heart. The title of the anthology is taken from a Vera Brittain poem called "To My Brother" in which she states: "Your battle wounds are scars upon my heart". This anthology includes poems such as "Perhaps" by Vera Brittain.

References

English poetry collections
British anthologies